Douglas Leon Atkins (May 8, 1930 – December 30, 2015) was an American professional football player who was a defensive end for the Cleveland Browns, Chicago Bears, and New Orleans Saints in the National Football League (NFL). He played college football for the Tennessee Volunteers under head coach Robert Neyland. He is a member of the College Football Hall of Fame and the Pro Football Hall of Fame.

Atkins was a fierce defender who was known for using his immense size and agility to his advantage. At , Atkins often batted passes down at the line of scrimmage and used his skills as a high jump champion to leapfrog blockers and get to the quarterback. Atkins was one of the first great exclusively defensive players in professional football and, along with fellow Hall of Famer Gino Marchetti, revolutionized the defensive end position.

Amateur career
Atkins was born May 8, 1930, in Humboldt, Tennessee. He attended Humboldt High School and played for the school's basketball team, which won the state championship in 1949 with an undefeated record. He enrolled at the University of Tennessee to play for the Tennessee Volunteers of the Southeastern Conference (SEC) on a basketball scholarship, but once American football head coach Bob Neyland saw his combination of size and agility, he was recruited for the football team. Atkins played on the 1951 Tennessee Volunteers football team that won the national championship. He earned All-America honors in 1952. Atkins is one of the few players in Tennessee history to have his number retired.  He was considered one of the, if not the, most dominant defensive players in SEC history. Atkins was the only unanimous selection to the SEC All Quarter-Century team and was selected as the overall SEC "Player of the Quarter-Century" for the years 1950 to 1975. At Tennessee, Atkins also lettered in three seasons in track and field and one season in basketball. He finished runner-up in the high jump at the 1952 Southeastern Conference championships with a mark of 6' 6" (1.98m) which placed him 25th in the world that year.

Professional career
The Cleveland Browns selected Atkins with the 11th overall selection in the 1953 NFL draft. He played his first two seasons in the NFL with the Browns, winning the NFL Eastern Conference in 1953, and the NFL Championship in 1954. The Browns traded Atkins and Ken Gorgal to the Chicago Bears for a third-round and a sixth-round pick in the 1956 NFL draft. According to Pat Summerall, Atkins was traded by Paul Brown for burping out loud in a team meeting. In Chicago, Atkins quickly became the leader of a devastating defensive unit. With the Bears, Atkins was a First-team All-Pro selection in 1958, 1960, 1961, and 1963, along with being a starter in the Pro Bowl in eight of his last nine years with Chicago.

At the 1966 Pro Bowl, Atkins announced his retirement from football. He changed his mind and signed with the Bears for the 1966 season. Before the 1967 season, Atkins requested a trade from Chicago and was traded to the New Orleans Saints. He suffered a fractured knee cap during the 1968 season. He retired after the 1969 season. On the final play of his NFL career, Atkins sacked Pittsburgh Steelers quarterback Dick Shiner, preserving the Saints' 27–24 victory in the 1969 season finale.

Honors
Atkins was inducted into the Pro Football Hall of Fame in 1982 and the College Football Hall of Fame in 1985. He has also been inducted into the Chicagoland Sports Hall of Fame. His collegiate jersey number, #91, was retired by the University of Tennessee in 2005.

Even though he only played three seasons for New Orleans, the club retired his #81, one of two numbers originally retired by the franchise. The other, #31, belongs to Hall of Fame fullback Jim Taylor, a long-time rival of Atkins during Taylor's days with the Green Bay Packers.

The NFL Network ranked him as the number 9 Pass Rusher of All Time in its Top Ten show. During a 1983 segment about Atkins on the NFL Films show "This Is the NFL", legendary narrator John Facenda described Atkins "like a storm rolling over a Kansas farmhouse. He came from all directions, and all there was to do was to tie down what you could, and hope he didn't take the roof".

Personal life
Atkins married twice. His first wife was from Humboldt, and he married his second wife, from Milan, Tennessee, after the death of his first wife. He played a minor acting role as "Jebbo" in the 1975 film, Breakheart Pass, starring Charles Bronson. After he retired from the NFL, Atkins worked in various jobs, including as an exterminator, as a pipe system manager, and selling caskets to funeral homes.

Atkins died of natural causes at Fort Sanders Regional Medical Center in Knoxville, Tennessee, on December 30, 2015, at the age of 85. He was survived by his wife, brother, and three sons.

References

External links
 
 
 

1930 births
2015 deaths
American football defensive ends
American football ends
American football tackles
American men's basketball players
Basketball players from Tennessee
Chicago Bears players
Cleveland Browns players
College Football Hall of Fame inductees
Minneapolis Lakers draft picks
New Orleans Saints players
People from Humboldt, Tennessee
Players of American football from Tennessee
Pro Football Hall of Fame inductees
Tennessee Volunteers basketball players
Tennessee Volunteers football players
Western Conference Pro Bowl players
National Football League players with retired numbers